Allah Rud (also Romanized as Allah Rūd; also known as Lalehrūd and Lelārūd) is a village in Chini Jan Rural District, in the Central District of Rudsar County, Gilan Province, Iran. At the 2006 census, its population was 208, in 56 families.

References 

Populated places in Rudsar County